A bear attack is an attack by a bear on another animal, although it usually refers to a bear attacking a human or domestic pet. Bear attacks are of particular concern for those who are in bear habitats. They can be fatal and often hikers, hunters, fishers, and others in bear country take precautions against bear attacks.

Stephen Herrero, a Canadian biologist, reports that during the 1990s, bears killed around three people a year in the U.S. and Canada, as compared to the 30 to 50 people killed every year by dogs.

Causes 
Almost all recorded bear attacks in the wild have resulted from the human surprising the bear. Hunters are the people most at risk of bear attacks because, as Tom Smith, a U.S. Geographical Survey research biologist, describes, "Hunters typically aren't making any noise, and they sleuth around while wearing camo." Hunters try to be silent and, though many hunters wear reflective clothing so as not to become targets for other hunters, they try to hide their movements so as not to startle game. Most bear attacks result from hunters suddenly appearing in front of them, startling a bear into an instinctive act of aggression.

A bear's first reaction upon detecting a human is to run away. Fergus lists a few possible causes for this instinctive reaction, each a speculation or theory based more on intuition rather than physical evidence. Some speculate that bears inherit their cautious nature from thousands of years ago when they had to be wary of larger and more dangerous carnivores. Some believe that bears have come to relate a human presence to firearms, or other weaponry, that they have come to fear. Still others think that hunters tend to target more aggressive bears, thus leaving only the more shy and timid bears to reproduce, creating a population of bears less hostile than before.

Protecting young

One of the most dangerous situations that leads to bear attacks is when a bear perceives a threat to her offspring. Sow bears are very protective of their young, devoting, on their own without any participation of the male bear, many years of their lives just to raise their cubs and teach them to hunt, hence the term "mama bear" to refer to extremely reactive and protective mothers of humans, particularly those who do this without paternal care. While solo bears will usually retreat, a mother bear protecting her cubs is most likely to attack any sudden threat. Black bears present something of an exception to this, however, as mother black bears sometimes urge their cubs to climb trees for safety instead of remaining on the ground to protect their young.

Hunger
Another dangerous situation is when a human is faced with a hungry bear that has lost its natural fear of humans. With the decrease of hunting grounds and food crops such as berries and bark, bears often become more desperate and aggressive. However, this hunger has also triggered an unexpected reaction: bears began to follow gunfire because they associate it with dead animals that they can eat.

Once a bear claims an animal carcass, it becomes very protective of its kill. This becomes a problem when a bear claims a hunter's kill, as the hunter may not wish to kill the bear as well. By avoiding a bear over a carcass, the risk of attack is reduced by around fifty percent.

Predatory

Bears may act aggressively toward humans even when they are not hungry, protecting a kill, or protecting their young. Most fatal attacks by black bears have been judged as predatory. Bear researcher Stephen Herrero determined that in black bear attacks, the bear acted as a predator in 88 percent of fatal incidents.

Species, and respective aggressiveness

American black bears
American black bears are abundant in much of North America. In the US and Canada, there were between 10 and 200,000 black bears in most states or provinces as of a 1996 count. In 1996, it was estimated that there were between 735,000 and 941,000 black bears in the United States and Canada combined. Only seven states and one province had none.

Unlike grizzly bears, which became a subject of fearsome legend among the European settlers of North America, black bears were rarely considered overly dangerous, even though they lived in areas where the pioneers had settled. Black bears rarely attack when confronted by humans, and usually limit themselves to making mock charges, emitting blowing noises and swatting the ground with their forepaws. 

According to Stephen Herrero in his Bear Attacks: Their Causes and Avoidance, 23 people were killed by black bears from 1900 to 1980. The number of black bear attacks on humans is higher than those of brown bears, though this is largely because black bears outnumber brown bears rather than being more aggressive. Compared to brown bear attacks, violent encounters with black bears rarely lead to serious injury and death. However, the majority of black bear attacks tend to be motivated by hunger rather than territoriality, and thus victims have a higher probability of surviving by fighting back rather than submitting. Unlike grizzlies, female black bears do not display the same level of protectiveness toward their cubs, and will seldom attack humans in their vicinity. However, it is a very common occurrence for the American black bear to take food from campsites, and even from time to time break into people's homes to get food.

The worst recorded fatality incident occurred in May 1978, in which a black bear killed three teenagers fishing in Algonquin Park in Canada. The majority of attacks happened in national parks, usually near campgrounds, where the bears had become habituated to human contact and food. Between 1964 and 1976 in the Great Smoky Mountains National Park, there were 1,028 documented incidents of black bears acting aggressively toward people, 107 of which resulted in injury. These incidents occurred mainly in tourist hotspots, where people regularly fed the bears handouts.

Asian black bears

Though usually shy and cautious animals, Asian black bears are more aggressive toward humans than the brown bears of Eurasia. According to Brigadier General R.G. Burton:

E. T. Vere of Srinagar, Kashmir wrote of how his hospital received dozens of black bear victims annually. He wrote that, when attacking humans, black bears will rear up on their hind legs and knock victims over with their paws. They then make one or two bites on an arm or leg and finish with a snap to the head, this being the most dangerous part of the attack. There are no records of predation on humans by Asiatic black bears in Russia and no conflicts have been documented in Taiwan. However, in India, attacks on humans have been increasing yearly and have occurred largely in the northwestern and western Himalayan region. In the Chamba District of Himachal Pradesh, the number of black bear attacks on humans gradually increased from 10 in 1988–89 to 21 in 1991–92.

Recent bear attacks on humans have been reported from Junbesi and Langtang National Park in Nepal, and occurred in villages as well as in the surrounding forest. Li Guoxing, the second person in history to have received a facial transplant, was a victim of a black bear attack. Nine people were killed by black bears in Japan between 1979 and 1989, and more recently, in September 2009, it was reported that a black bear attacked a group of tourists, seriously injuring four, while they were waiting at a bus station in the built-up area of Takayama, Gifu in central Japan. The majority of attacks tend to occur when black bears are encountered suddenly, and at close quarters. Because of this, black bears are generally considered more dangerous than sympatric brown bears, which live in more open spaces and are thus less likely to be surprised by approaching humans. They are also likely to attack when protecting food.

Brown bears

As a rule, brown bears seldom attack humans on sight, and usually avoid people. They are, however, unpredictable in temperament, and will attack if they are surprised or feel threatened. Sows with cubs account for the majority of injuries and fatalities in North America. Habituated or food conditioned bears can also be dangerous, as their long-term exposure to humans causes them to lose their natural shyness, and in some cases associate humans with food. Small parties of one or two people are more often attacked than large groups, with no attacks being recorded against parties of more than seven people. In contrast to injuries caused by American black bears, which are usually minor, brown bear attacks tend to result in serious injury and in some cases death. In the majority of attacks resulting in injury, brown bears precede the attack with a growl or huffing sound, and seem to confront humans as they would when fighting other bears: they rise up on their hind legs, and attempt to "disarm" their victims by biting and holding on to the lower jaw to avoid being bitten in turn. Such a bite can be more severe than that of a tiger, and has been known to crush the heads of some human victims.

Most attacks occur in the months of July, August and September, the time when the number of outdoor recreationalists, such as hikers or hunters, is higher. People who assert their presence through noises tend to be less vulnerable, as they alert bears to their presence. In direct confrontations, people who run are statistically more likely to be attacked than those who stand their ground. Violent encounters with brown bears usually last only a few minutes, though they can be prolonged if the victims fight back.

Attacks on humans are considered extremely rare in the former Soviet Union, though exceptions exist in districts where they are not pursued by hunters. East Siberian brown bears for example tend to be much bolder toward humans than their shyer, more frequently hunted European counterparts. In 2008, a platinum mining compound in the Olyotorsky district of northern Kamchatka was besieged by a group of 30 Kamchatka brown bears that killed two guards and prevented workers from leaving their homes. In Scandinavia, only three fatal attacks were recorded in the 20th century. Due to increasing brown bear population in Turkey, attacks still occur in mountainous areas of Northeastern Turkey.

Native American tribes whose territories overlapped with those of grizzly bears often viewed them with a mixture of awe and fear. North American brown bears were so feared by the Natives that they were rarely hunted, especially alone. When Natives hunted grizzlies, the act was done with the same preparation and ceremoniality as intertribal warfare, and was never done except with a company of 4 to 10 warriors. The tribe members who dealt the killing blow were highly esteemed among their compatriots. Californian Indians actively avoided prime bear habitat, and would not allow their young men to hunt alone, for fear of bear attacks. During the Spanish colonial period, some tribes, instead of hunting grizzlies themselves, would seek aid from European colonists to deal with problem bears. Many authors in the American west wrote of Natives or voyagers with lacerated faces and missing noses or eyes due to attacks from grizzlies. Within Yellowstone National Park, injuries caused by grizzly attacks in developed areas averaged approximately 1 per year during the 1930s through the 1950s, though it increased to 4 per year during the 1960s. They then decreased to 1 injury every 2 years (0.5/year) during the 1970s. Between 1980 and 2002, there were only 2 grizzly bear-caused human injuries in a developed area. However, although grizzly attacks were rare in the back-country before 1970, the number of attacks increased to an average of approximately 1 per year during the 1970s, 1980s, and 1990s.

According to bear biologist Charles Jonkel, one reason for bear attacks is the lack of important foods such as huckleberry, buffalo berry, and white-bark pine nut. Winter freezes may be one reason for the food shortages.

Polar bears
Polar bears, particularly starving males, will hunt humans for food, though attacks on humans by female bears are rare. Between 1870 and 2014, out of 73 recorded polar bear attacks there were 20 human fatalities and 69 injuries. Polar bears are often judged as the predators in these interactions as nearly all recorded attacks happened to groups of at least two people.

A polar bear killed one and injured four others on 5 August 2011 in the Norwegian archipelago of Svalbard when it attacked a party of university students camped near the Von Post glacier, some 25 miles (40 km) from the settlement of Longyearbyen.

Sloth bears
In some areas of India and Burma, sloth bears are more feared than tigers, due to their unpredictable temperament. In Madhya Pradesh, sloth bear attacks accounted for the deaths of 48 people and the injuring of 686 others between the years 1989 and 1994, probably due in part to the density of population and competition for food sources. One specimen, known as the sloth bear of Mysore, was single-handedly responsible for the deaths of 12 people and the mutilation of 2 dozen others before being shot by Kenneth Anderson. Sloth bears defend themselves when surprised, with the majority of confrontations occurring at night. They typically charge on all fours with their head held low, before rearing on their hind legs and striking at their attackers with their claws and teeth.

History of human–bear relationships 

According to Wild Bears of the Worlds, by Paul Ward and Suzanne Kynaston, human contact with bears has existed since the time of the Neanderthals and the European cave bear around 200,000 to 75,000 years ago. There is some evidence of cave bear worship during these early years: between the years 1917 and 1922, Emil Bachler discovered a large stone chest filled with cave bear skulls in the Drachenloch Cave in Switzerland, one of the Wildkirchli; between 1916 and 1922, Konrad Hormann found narrow niches filled with five cave bear skulls. 

Ward and Kynaston go on to report that Cro-Magnon humans, who first appeared nearly 35,000 years ago, show more obvious evidence of cave bear worship in the forms of paintings, sculptures, and engravings; however, there is still some doubt as to whether these works specifically depict the cave bear or the European brown bear.

In the 1900s, bear populations had been decreasing because of increased hunting of bears for sustenance (done mostly by native peoples such as the Inupiat of Alaska and the Inuvialuit of Canada) and for trophy prizes. Polar bear skins became popular as a sign of wealth and prestige, especially in Europe during the Victorian era. Comparatively, the pelts of giant panda, were also highly valued, priced at around 176,000 U.S. dollars. Settlers, indigenous, villagers and farmers defended their families and livestock by killing the local predators, including bears. This practice is still in place where necessary and legal.

More recently, laws have been instated to protect the dwindling populations of bears; however, as stated in Return of the Grizzly by David Whitman, these laws have increased the tensions between bears and humans. While this allows bear populations to recuperate, it also prevents people from killing bears that have invaded their property and killed their livestock.

Natural weapons and armor 
The various species of bear are well-developed for survival, both for attaining food and defending against predators, including unarmed humans. The different species all have the same general physical characteristics and senses that allow them to adapt to situations that threaten their survival.

Fur
A bear's fur is often very thick, and it can function much like armor. In situations between bears and other predators, such as humans, this thick fur acts with the bear's thick skin and layers of fat as a buffer against most physical attacks, sometimes buffering to some extent even against firearms. According to Charles Fergus' Wild Guide: Bears, bear fur is also a source of insulation that allows bears to inhabit almost any habitat, from the hot jungles inhabited by sun bears and sloth bears to the frozen tundra inhabited by polar bears, thus occupying most of the same territory as humanity.

Muscle
A bear's muscular structure is highly suited for strength and power. Polar bears are known to swim for kilometers in search of food and to scoop  seals out of the water. 

Grizzly bears can bring down prey, such as bison or moose, that outweigh the bear by several hundred kilograms and can steal kills from entire packs of wolves. Most people are incapable of reaching speeds even remotely close to this number; thus, it is impossible for a human to outrun a bear, even one not running at its highest possible speed.

Claws

Bears have five digits on each dextrous paw, each digit with a long non-retractable claw.

Jaws
The jaws of a bear reflect its omnivorous eating habits. A bear has forty-two teeth, with canines, which can be even longer than those of a tiger. While a bear's canines can pierce flesh and tear meat, a bear's back teeth are relatively flat, better suited for eating plants rather than meat. However, the jaws of bears are controlled by large muscles that are capable of crushing bones, which gives access to the nutritious marrow within. Some grizzly bears have jaws that can bite through  pine trees.

Humans in contrast have thirty-two teeth, sixteen on each jaw, each tooth less than a half-inch long. Of these teeth, there are four incisors, two canines, four premolars, and six molars. While human incisors are capable of biting into meat, bears have more powerful jaw muscles, which make their bite more destructive to flesh. More appropriate comparisons to bear dentition are to those of dogs whose teeth are similar in proportion to those of bears (and of course much smaller, although capable of inflicting much damage even at their smaller size).

Other senses and characteristics
Bears' senses are likely similar to those of dogs, animals that at times have much the same build and dietary habits of bears.

Bears' sense of smell is dependent on a Jacobson's organ, or vomeronasal organ, which allows the bear to easily detect airborne scents. Bears use this sense of smell not only to hunt, but to detect other bears as well; male bears use smell to stay away from other male bears and to find female bears during mating season.

Little is known about a bear's hearing, but scientists concluded that it is at least as good as a human's. Some scientists believe that bears may even be able to detect ultrasonic sounds as well.

Natural observers believe that most bear species are near-sighted, which allows bears to forage for small objects such as berries. However, bears are also capable of discerning faraway movements, helping them hunt prey. The Kodiak bear, when compared to other species, appears to have vision comparable to a human (not near-sighted). Experiments show that black bears can see color, unlike many mammals. With scientists still working to determine exactly how perceptive bear eyes are, it is difficult to compare bear eyesight with human eyesight.

Recovery from bear attacks
Aside from the large lacerations, fractures, and other wounds that can result from bear attacks, infections are also physically detrimental. A bear's mouth is full of potentially harmful bacteria, especially if the bear has been feeding on a gut pile or feces. Bear bites can result in infections common to most animal bites, including abscesses, sepsis, and even rabies. Though there is little data, what is available from bear bite statistics indicates that bears do not tend to carry many of the most well-known dangerous anaerobic bacteria strains in their normal oral flora; however, given the circumstances of most bear attacks, wound contamination from the environment is highly likely and means there is risk of tetanus and other external microbial agents.

Recovery from bear attacks depends on the extent of damage, but often involves long-term medical treatment. As shown in the medical procedure led by Professor Shuzhong Guo, extreme cases of bear attacks have resulted in plastic surgeries and even facial transplants that, while successful, may take several years to complete and are sometimes fatal.

See also
 List of fatal bear attacks in North America
 Sloth bear of Mysore
 Sankebetsu brown bear incident
 Bear danger
 Timothy Treadwell
 Binky (polar bear)

References

Sources
 Anitei, Stefan. "The Limits of the Human Nose: How much can a human smell?" Softpedia. 22 January 2007. 17 November 2008 The Limits of the Human Nose
 Batin, Christopher. "Bear Attacks!" Outdoor Life 210.6 (2003): 46.
 Brandt, Anthony. "Attack". Outdoor Life 197.1 (1996): 52.
 Cardall, Taylor Y. and Peter Rosen. "Grizzly Bear Attack". The Journal of Emergency Medicine 24.3 (2003): 331–333.
 "Death Statistics Comparison". UnitedJustice.com. 7 December 2008. 7 December 2008. Death Statistics
 Driscoll, Jamus. "Bears on the Rampage". Outdoor Life 197.2 (1996): 20.
 Fergus, Charles. Wild Guide: Bears. Mechanisburg, PA; Stackpole Books, 2005.
 Guo, Shuzhong, et al. "Human facial allotransplantation: a 2-year follow-up study". The Lancet 372.9639 (2008): 631–638.
 Masterson, Linda. Living with Bears. Masonville, CO; PixyJack Press, LLC, 2006.
 Simmons, Shraga. "Olympic Champions". aish.com 22 August 2004. 17 November 2008. Olympic Champions
 "Teeth". The Internet Encyclopedia of Science: Anatomy & Physiology. 17 November 2008. teeth
 Ward, Paul and Suzanne Kynaston. Wild Bears of the World. United Kingdom: Cassell plc, 1995.
 Whitman, David. "The Return of the Grizzly". Atlantic Monthly 286.3 (2000): 26–31.

External links
 Bear Attack Videos
 Are guns more effective than pepper spray in an Alaska bear attack?
 Alaska Bear Attack Survivor - Dan Bigley
 CDC - NIOSH Science Blog - How to Avoid Bear Attacks (and other small business concerns)
 TS-1000801 Liard Hot Springs Black bear Attack Uploaded by Rich.Vernadeau at Your Listen
The Guthrie daily leader., July 07, 1894, Image 4 "Trapped and fought a bear.."